is a Japanese sports shooter. He competed in the men's 25 metre rapid fire pistol event at the 2016 Summer Olympics.

References

External links
 

1983 births
Living people
Japanese male sport shooters
Olympic shooters of Japan
Shooters at the 2016 Summer Olympics
Place of birth missing (living people)